Dimitrios Koukoulitsios was a Greek football player during the 1970s. He played only for his hometown team AEL from 1972 to 1979. He became a professional at the early age of 15 and he earned 119 caps, scoring 22 goals. During this period, he was a part of U-17, U-19 and U-21 Greece national teams.

Koukoulitsios died in a car accident in Thiva on 6 September 1979, along with his teammate Dimitrios Mousiaris. He was only 19. In the car was Giannis Valaoras too, who survived and became one of AEL's best of all times.

1960 births
1979 deaths
Footballers from Larissa
Athlitiki Enosi Larissa F.C. players
Greek footballers
Road incident deaths in Greece
Association football forwards
Association football midfielders